Sharon Christa McAuliffe ( Corrigan; September 2, 1948 – January 28, 1986) was an American teacher and astronaut from Concord, New Hampshire, who was killed on the Space Shuttle Challenger on mission STS-51-L where she was serving as a payload specialist.

She received her bachelor's degree in education and history from Framingham State College in 1970 and her master's degree in education, supervision and administration from Bowie State University in 1978. She took a teaching position as a social studies teacher at Concord High School in New Hampshire in 1983.

In 1985, McAuliffe was selected from more than 11,000 applicants to the NASA Teacher in Space Project and was scheduled to become the first teacher to fly in space. As a member of mission STS-51-L, she was planning to conduct experiments and teach two lessons from Challenger. On January 28, 1986, the shuttle broke apart 1 minute 13 seconds after launch, killing all onboard.  After her death, several schools were named in her honor, and she was posthumously awarded the Congressional Space Medal of Honor in 2004.

Early life
Sharon Christa Corrigan was born on September 2, 1948, in Boston as the oldest of the five children of accountant Edward Christopher Corrigan (1922–1990), who was of Irish descent; and Grace Mary Corrigan (1924–2018; née George), a substitute teacher, whose father was of Lebanese Maronite descent. McAuliffe was a great niece of Lebanese-American historian Philip Khuri Hitti. She was known by her middle name from an early age, although in later years she signed her name "S. Christa Corrigan", and eventually "S. Christa McAuliffe".

The year she was born, her father was completing his sophomore year at Boston College. Not long after, he took a job as an assistant comptroller in a Boston department store, and they moved to Framingham, Massachusetts, where she attended and graduated from Marian High School in 1966. She went on to earn a bachelor's degree in 1970 from Framingham State College, now Framingham State University. As a youth, she was inspired by Project Mercury and the Apollo Moon landing program. The day after John Glenn orbited the Earth in Friendship 7, she told a friend at Marian High, "Do you realize that someday people will be going to the Moon? Maybe even taking a bus, and I want to do that!" She wrote years later on her NASA application form: "I watched the Space Age being born, and I would like to participate."

In 1970, she married her longtime boyfriend whom she had known since high school, Steven J. McAuliffe, a 1970 graduate of the Virginia Military Institute, and they moved closer to Washington, D.C., so that he could attend the Georgetown University Law Center. They had two children, Scott and Caroline, who were nine and six, respectively, when she died.

She obtained her first teaching position in 1970, as an American history teacher at Benjamin Foulois Junior High School in Morningside, Maryland. From 1971 to 1978, she taught history and civics at Thomas Johnson Middle School in Lanham, Maryland. In addition to teaching, she completed a Master of Arts in education supervision and administration from Bowie State University in Maryland. In 1978, she moved to Concord, New Hampshire, when Steven accepted a job as an assistant to the New Hampshire Attorney General. McAuliffe taught 7th and 8th grade American history and English in Concord, New Hampshire, and 9th grade English in Bow, New Hampshire, before taking a teaching post at Concord High School in 1983.

She was a social studies teacher, and taught several courses including American history, law, and economics, in addition to a self-designed course: "The American Woman". Taking field trips and bringing in speakers were an important part of her teaching techniques. According to The New York Times, she "emphasized the impact of ordinary people on history, saying they were as important to the historical record as kings, politicians or generals."

Teacher in Space Project

In 1984, President Ronald Reagan announced the Teacher in Space Project, and Christa learned about NASA's efforts to find their first civilian, an educator, to fly into space. NASA wanted to find an "ordinary person," a gifted teacher who could communicate with students while in orbit. McAuliffe became one of more than 11,000 applicants.

NASA hoped that sending a teacher into space would increase public interest in the Space Shuttle program, and also demonstrate the reliability of space flight at a time when the agency was under continuous pressure to find financial support. President Reagan said it would also remind Americans of the important role that teachers and education serve in their country.

The Council of Chief State School Officers, a non-profit organization of public officials in education, was chosen by NASA to coordinate the selection process. Out of the initial applicant pool, 114 semi-finalists were nominated by state, territorial, and agency review panels. McAuliffe was one of two teachers nominated by the state of New Hampshire. The semi-finalists gathered in Washington, D.C., from June 22–27, 1985, for a conference on space education and to meet with the Review Panel that would select the 10 finalists.

On July 1, 1985, she was announced as one of the 10 finalists, and on July 7 she traveled to Johnson Space Center for a week of thorough medical examinations and briefings about space flight. The finalists were interviewed by an evaluation committee composed of senior NASA officials, and the committee made recommendations to NASA Administrator James M. Beggs for the primary and backup candidates for the Teacher in Space Project. On July 19, 1985, Vice President George H. W. Bush announced that she had been selected for the position. Another teacher, Barbara Morgan, served as her backup. According to Mark Travis of the Concord Monitor, it was her manner that set her apart from the other candidates. NASA official Alan Ladwig said "she had an infectious enthusiasm", and NASA psychiatrist Terrence McGuire told New Woman magazine that "she was the most broad-based, best-balanced person of the 10."

Later that year, McAuliffe and Morgan each took a year-long leave of absence from teaching in order to train for a Space Shuttle mission in early 1986. NASA paid both their salaries. While not a member of the NASA Astronaut Corps, McAuliffe was to be part of the STS-51-L crew, and would conduct experiments and teach lessons from space. Her planned duties included basic science experiments in the fields of chromatography, hydroponics, magnetism, and Newton's laws. She was also planning to conduct two 15-minute classes from space, including a tour of the spacecraft, called "The Ultimate Field Trip", and a lesson about the benefits of space travel, called "Where We've Been, Where We're Going, Why". The lessons were to be broadcast to millions of schoolchildren via closed-circuit TV. To record her thoughts, McAuliffe intended to keep a personal journal like a "woman on the Conestoga wagons pioneering the West."

After being chosen to be the first teacher in space, she was a guest on several television programs, including Good Morning America; the CBS Morning News; the Today Show; and The Tonight Show Starring Johnny Carson, where, when asked about the mission, she stated, "If you're offered a seat on a rocket ship, don't ask what seat. Just get on." She had an immediate rapport with the media, and the Teacher in Space Project received popular attention as a result.

Disaster and aftermath

According to NASA, it was in part because of the excitement over her presence on the shuttle that the accident had such a significant effect on the nation. Many schoolchildren were viewing the launch live, and media coverage of the accident was extensive.

Barbara Morgan, her backup, became a professional astronaut in January 1998, and flew on Space Shuttle mission STS-118, to the International Space Station, on August 8, 2007, aboard Endeavour, the orbiter that replaced Challenger.

Legacy
McAuliffe was buried at Blossom Hill Cemetery in her hometown, Concord. She has since been honored at many events, including the Daytona 500 NASCAR race in 1986. The McAuliffe-Shepard Discovery Center in Concord, the Christa Corrigan McAuliffe Center for Education and Teaching Excellence at Framingham State University, the Christa McAuliffe Intermediate School in Brooklyn, NY, the McAuliffe Branch Library in Framingham, MA, the Christa McAuliffe Adult Learning Center in Baton Rouge, LA, and the S. Christa McAuliffe Elementary School in Lowell, Massachusetts, were named in her memory,  as are the asteroid 3352 McAuliffe, the crater McAuliffe on the Moon, and a crater on the planet Venus, which was named McAuliffe by the Soviet Union. Approximately 40 schools around the world have been named after her, including the Christa McAuliffe Space Education Center in Pleasant Grove, Utah.

Scholarships and other events have also been established in her memory. The Christa McAuliffe Technology Conference has been held in Nashua, New Hampshire, every year since 1986, and is devoted to the use of technology in all aspects of education. The Nebraska McAuliffe Prize honors a Nebraska teacher each year for courage and excellence in education. Grants in her name, honoring innovative teachers, are provided by the American Association of State Colleges and Universities and the National Council for the Social Studies.

She was portrayed by Karen Allen in the 1990 TV movie Challenger. In October 2018, it was announced that Michelle Williams was cast to portray McAuliffe in The Challenger, another retelling of the Space Shuttle Challenger disaster. In 2019, McAuliffe was portrayed by Erika Waldorf in the independent film The Challenger Disaster. The spaceship on the 1996–1997 children's science-fiction series Space Cases, about a group of students lost in space, was called "Christa". In 2006, a documentary film about her and Morgan called Christa McAuliffe: Reach for the Stars aired on CNN in the CNN Presents format. The film, produced by Renee Sotile and Mary Jo Godges, commemorated the 20th anniversary of her death. It was narrated by Susan Sarandon, and included an original song by Carly Simon.

Her parents worked with Framingham State College to establish the McAuliffe Center. Her husband Steven J. McAuliffe remarried and in 1992 became a federal judge, serving with the United States District Court for the District of New Hampshire in Concord. Her son, Scott, completed graduate studies in marine biology, and her daughter, Caroline, went on to pursue the same career as her mother: teaching. On July 23, 2004, she and all the other 13 astronauts lost in both the Challenger and Columbia disasters were posthumously awarded the Congressional Space Medal of Honor by President George W. Bush.

On January 28, 2016, several teachers who competed alongside McAuliffe for a seat on the Challenger traveled to Cape Canaveral, Florida, for a 30th anniversary remembrance service, along with her widower, Steven and son, Scott. After remarking that 30 years had passed, Steven said "Challenger will always be an event that occurred just recently. Our thoughts and memories of Christa will always be fresh and comforting." In 2017, McAuliffe was inducted into the International Air & Space Hall of Fame at the San Diego Air & Space Museum.

In 2019, Congress passed the Christa McAuliffe Commemorative Coin Act which was signed into law by President Donald Trump on October 9, 2019. The bill allows the Department of the Treasury to "issue not more than 350,000 $1 silver coins in commemoration of Christa McAuliffe." The coins were minted in 2021.

Notes

References
.
.
.

Further reading
.

External links

Official NASA biography
Christa's Lost Lessons
The Christa Corrigan McAuliffe Collection at the Henry Whittemore Library in Framingham State College

Christa McAuliffe Planetarium
Christa Corrigan McAuliffe Center for Education and Teaching Excellence

1948 births
1986 deaths
20th-century American educators
Accidental deaths in Florida
American astronauts
American people of Irish descent
American people of Lebanese descent
Schoolteachers from New Hampshire
20th-century American women educators
Bowie State University alumni
Educator astronauts
Framingham State University alumni
NASA sponsored astronauts
People from Boston
People from Concord, New Hampshire
People from Framingham, Massachusetts
People from Lanham, Maryland
Recipients of the Congressional Space Medal of Honor
Space Shuttle program astronauts
Space Shuttle Challenger disaster
Space Shuttle Challenger disaster victims
Women astronauts
Spaceflight participants